Asni is a small town in the foothills of the High Atlas mountains near Marrakesh, Morocco.

It is connected to Ikkiss and Imlil by tracks. Open back trucks provide a bus service several times a week between these three villages.

External links

Lexicorient 

Populated places in Al Haouz Province
Rural communes of Marrakesh-Safi